The following is a timeline of the history of the city of Puebla, Mexico.

Prior to 18th century

 1531
 Puebla founded by Toribio Motolinia & Sebastián Ramírez de Fuenleal. 
 First mass celebrated 16 April 1531 by Toribio Motolinia.
 1533-1545 - Indios de Servicio provide labor to Puebla.
 1537 – College of the Holy Ghost founded by Jesuits.
 1541 – Textile mill in operation.
 1542 – School established.
 1543 – Catholic Diocese of Tlaxcala headquartered in Puebla.
 1551 – San Francisco Convent active.
 1552 – Puebla Cathedral construction begins.
 1555 – Fountain installed in Plaza Mayor.
 1556 – Joseph designated city patron saint.
 1578 - Colegio del Espíritu Santo founded
 1580 – Casa del Deán built.
 1592 – Hospital de San Roque founded.
 1609 – Convent of Santa Monica founded.
 1629 – Juan Gutiérrez de Padilla becomes Cathedral maestro de capilla.
 1632 – Hospital de San Bernardo opens.
 1639-1653 - Juan de Palafox y Mendoza, Bishop of Puebla
 1640 – Printing press in operation (approximate date).
 1646 – Biblioteca Palafoxiana founded.
 1649 – Puebla Cathedral consecrated.
 1653 – Potters' guild established.
 1659 – Church of Santo Domingo built (approximate date).
 1678 – Population: 68,800.
 1688 - Death of Catarina de San Juan, "la China Poblana"
 1690
  (chapel) built in the Church of Santo Domingo.
 Puebla Cathedral completed.

18th and 19th centuries
 1728 – Museum of antiquities established.
 1760 – Teatro Principal inaugurated.
 1764 – Estaban Bravo de Rivero becomes mayor.
 1767 – La Compania (Jesuit church) built.
 1771 – Jose Merino Ceballos becomes mayor.
 1793 – Population: 56,859.
 1813 – Academia de Bellas Artes founded.
 1827 – El Poblano newspaper begins publication.
 1844 – Paseo Bravo (street) laid out.
 1846 – El Patricio newspaper in publication.
 1847 – Siege of Puebla by United States forces.
 1862
 May 5: Battle of Puebla occurs near city.
 City renamed "Puebla de Zaragoza".
 1863 – May 16–17: Siege of Puebla by French forces.
 1867 - Seized by Mexicans under Porfirio Díaz.
 1868 – Guerrero theatre opens.
 1869 – Apizaco-Puebla Mexican Railway line built.
 1879 – Population: 64,588.
 1891 – Penitenciaria (prison) built.
 1893 – Velodrome in use.
 1895 – Population: 91,917.
 1897 – Railway station built.
 1898 – Rancho de la Magdalena becomes part of city.
 1900 – Population: 93,521.

20th century

 1901 – Franco-Mexican monument erected (approximate date).
 1906 –  built.
 1910
 Victoria Market opens.
 Population: 101,214.
 1911 – Gaceta de Puebla newspaper begins publication.
 1924 – La Opinion newspaper in publication.
 1926 – Mexico City-Puebla highway completed.
 1931
 400th anniversary of city founding.
 Population: 124,063.
 1937 – University of Puebla founded.
 1942 - Colegio Americano de Puebla founded.
 1944
 Club de Fútbol Puebla formed.
 El Sol de Puebla newspaper begins publication.
  (museum) opens.
 1950 – Population: 206,840.
 1960 – Population: 297,257.
 1962 – Area of city expanded.
 1964 – Volkswagen automotive manufactory begins operating.
 1968 – Estadio Cuauhtémoc (stadium) opens.
 1973 – Universidad Popular Autónoma del Estado de Puebla and Museo de Arte Cultural Poblano established.
 1985 – Hermanos Serdán International Airport inaugurated.
 1987
 Historic Downtown area designated an UNESCO World Heritage Site.
  (garden) established.
 1988 – Central de Autobuses Puebla (depot) inaugurated.
 1991 – Amparo Museum inaugurated.

21st century

 2002 – San Pedro Museum of Art active.
 2005 –  becomes mayor.
 2008 – Blanca Alcalá becomes mayor.
 2010
 Eduardo Rivera Pérez elected mayor.
 Population: 1,434,062; metro 2,668,437.
 2014 – José Antonio Gali Fayad becomes mayor.
 2017 - Puebla earthquake

See also
 Puebla history (city)
 List of mayors of Puebla (city)
 History of Puebla (state)
 List of governors in the Viceroyalty of New Spain: Province of Puebla
 List of Governors of Puebla (state)

References

This article incorporates information from the Spanish Wikipedia.

Bibliography
Altman, Ida, Transatlantic Ties in the Spanish Empire: Brihuega, Spain and Puebla, Mexico 1560-1620. Stanford: Stanford University Press 2000.
 
Ramos, Frances L. Identity, Ritual, and Power in Colonial Puebla. Tucson: University of Arizona Press

Guidebooks

 
 
 
 
 
 
 
  (fulltext via OpenLibrary)
  (fulltext via OpenLibrary)

Works in Spanish
 
 
  (includes directory)
  (Annotated list of titles published in Puebla, arranged chronologically)
  (fulltext via OpenLibrary)

External links

 Europeana. Items related to Puebla, Mexico, various dates.
 Digital Public Library of America. Items related to Puebla, Mexico, various dates

 
Puebla (city)
Puebla